María Murillo (born 15 December 1996) is a Panamanian international footballer who plays as a defender for the Panama women's national football team. She appeared in four matches for Panama at the 2018 CONCACAF Women's Championship.

See also
 List of Panama women's international footballers

References

1996 births
Living people
Sportspeople from Panama City
Panamanian women's footballers
Women's association football defenders
Panama women's international footballers
Pan American Games competitors for Panama
Footballers at the 2019 Pan American Games
Panamanian expatriate women's footballers
Panamanian expatriate sportspeople in Costa Rica
Expatriate women's footballers in Costa Rica